This is a list of the busiest airports in Ecuador by passenger traffic and by aircraft movements.

2018

Busiest airports by passenger traffic

2017

Busiest airports by passenger traffic

References

Busiest
Busiest Airports
Ecuador